Marcus Collins (born 15 May 1988) is an English singer who was a finalist on the eighth series of The X Factor in 2011. He was mentored by Take That frontman Gary Barlow and finished as the runner-up.

His debut album, the self-titled Marcus Collins which featured production by the London-based Metrophonic team of Whitney Houston and Cher fame, became his first top 10 UK album which has his single "Mercy". His debut single from the album was "Seven Nation Army", a cover of The White Stripes hit, which also became his first top 10 UK single.

Career

Eton Road
Prior to his solo audition in 2011 Collins was a member of four piece boyband Eton Road, who rose to fame on the third series of The X Factor. Collins did not appear on The X Factor that year, but joined the band after original member Anthony Hannah left the band due to exhaustion. Anthony performed over 150 gigs with the band.

The X Factor (2011)
In 2011, Collins chose to audition as a solo artist for the eighth series of The X Factor in front of judges Louis Walsh, Gary Barlow, Kelly Rowland and Tulisa. His audition was successful as all four judges put him through to bootcamp. He then progressed through to judges' houses where he was put through to the live shows by Barlow in his Boys category (solo males aged 16–24) alongside Craig Colton, Frankie Cocozza and James Michael. He beat over 200,000 other contestants to earn his place in the grand final at Wembley Arena where he finished as the runner-up. Collins performed the following songs on The X Factor:

2012: Debut album and Hairspray
In January 2012, Collins signed a record deal with RCA Records and announced that was set to release his debut studio album in March. On 21 January, it was announced that his debut single would be a cover of The White Stripes' "Seven Nation Army". The single was released on 4 March. It was an exact copy of an arrangement of the song previously recorded by French artist Ben l'Oncle Soul that had been a hit in Europe. The song received a mixed reception, with fans of The White Stripes comparing the song in unfavourable light to the original. The song charted at number nine on the UK Singles Chart and spent three weeks on the chart. Collins then released his self-titled debut album on 12 March 2012 and debuted and peaked at number seven on the UK Albums Chart. "Mercy" was released as the second single from the album, making it Collins' first self penned single. The music video for "Mercy" was released on 24 April 2012, with the single released on 3 June 2012. It was relatively unsuccessful, reaching only 194 on the UK Singles Chart, due to lack of proper promotion.

On 16 October 2012, it was announced that Collins would star as Seaweed Stubbs in the 2013 UK Tour of Hairspray, from February–September 2013. After completing the tour, Collins, Beth Tweddle, Jazmine Franks, Tom Scurr and Kelly-Marie Stewart took part in a world record-breaking charity skydive.

2013–present
He has appeared in Kinky Boots the musical at The Adelphi Theatre in London's West End which stars Matt Henry and Killian Donnelly. On 27 September 2013, after finishing with Hairspray, Collins revealed that he had left RCA and signed with a new record company: "It was all mutually agreed. To be honest, it just didn't feel like we were going in the same direction. I loved working with them but it just got to a point where we both could go either way." Regarding his new album, He announced that he would be back in the recording studio "for the majority of October". Regarding his new album, Collins explained: "We've got about seven or eight songs that we're going to put down. We've got some new tracks and we've got some acoustic ones that are a little bit different. [Acoustic songs are] something that I've done before, but the record label I was with previously had different ideas and that's kind of why we separated." As of 2023 neither a new recording contract or album have been confirmed nor released.

He latterly was on tour playing Hud in the stage show Hair.

As of 2023, he is currently playing Andre in Mrs Doubtfire The Musical at Manchester Opera House

Discography

Albums

Singles

As featured artist

References

Living people
1988 births
21st-century Black British male singers
British hairdressers
English male singer-songwriters
English people of Grenadian descent
English pop singers
English gay musicians
LGBT Black British people
English LGBT singers
English LGBT songwriters
Musicians from Liverpool
Gay singers
Gay songwriters
Sony BMG artists
The X Factor (British TV series) contestants
20th-century LGBT people
21st-century English LGBT people